Indie 2000 was a series of alternative music compilations that enjoyed moderate success in Australia throughout the latter half of the 1990s. There were a total of nine volumes. The title was changed to simply Indie for volumes 8 and 9. The compilations consisted of popular alternative songs, a considerable amount of them being by Australian bands.

Discography

Indie 2000 Volume 1

Disc 1
 "Jesus Built My Hotrod (Album Version)" – Ministry  
 "A.D.I.D.A.S." – Korn  
 "Slave" – Silverchair  
 "Mach 5" – The Presidents of the United States of America  
 "Soldiers" – You Am I  
 "Here We Go" – Shelter  
 "Punk Rock Song" – Bad Religion  
 "Let There Be Rock" – Hard-Ons  
 "Cromagnon Man" – Snout  
 "Jerks of Attention" – Jebediah  
 "Krupa (440 Edit)" – Apollo 440  
 "Born Slippy .NUXX (Short)" – Underworld  
 "Voodoo People" – The Prodigy  
 "Fire Water Burn" – Bloodhound Gang  
 "Breathing Through My Eyes" – Skunkhour  
 "Drugs" – Ammonia  
 "Tons of Bricks" – The Meanies  
 "Small" – Effigy  
 "Higher Than You Think" – Something for Kate

Disc 2
 "Place Your Hands" – Reef  
 "Hey Dude" – Kula Shaker  
 "It's Like Sound" – Automatic  
 "Don't Look Back in Anger" – Oasis  
 "Coppertone" – Fini Scad  
 "From Here on In" – The Living End  
 "Cult of Personality" – Living Colour  
 "Nearly Lost You" – Screaming Trees  
 "Interloper" – The Mark of Cain  
 "Not an Addict" – K's Choice  
 "Barrel of a Gun" – Depeche Mode  
 "Space Shanty" – Leftfield  
 "Dead Eyes Opened" – Severed Heads  
 "Effervescence" – Pollyanna  
 "Infatuation" – Moler  
 "I Am Awake" – Rail  
 "Where Did She Come From" – Hard-Ons  
 "Love Measurer" – Custard

Indie 2000 Volume 2

Disc 1
 "The Beautiful People" – Marilyn Manson 
 "The Perfect Drug" – Nine Inch Nails 
 "Funky Shit" – The Prodigy
 "Into My Arms" – Nick Cave 
 "Some Kind of Bliss" – Kylie Minogue 
 "Coma" – Pendulum
 "Remember Me" – Blue Boy
 "DC×3" – Grinspoon
 "Abuse Me" – Silverchair
 "Last Cup of Sorrow" – Faith No More
 "Swallowed" – Bush
 "Why's Everybody Always Pickin' on Me?" – Bloodhound Gang
 "I Go Off" – Diana ah Naid
 "Good God" – Korn
 "Dance with the Devil (Radio Mix)" – Raggadeath 
 "A Life Less Ordinary" - Ash
 "Here in Your Bedroom" – Goldfinger
 "Early to Bed" – Morphine
 "More than This" – 10,000 Maniacs

Disc 2
 "Military Strongmen" – Jebediah 
 "Naughty Boy" – The Mavis's 
 "Pulse" – Front End Loader
 "There's Your Dad" – Frenzal Rhomb
 "George" – Headless Chickens
 "Isaac or Fuzz" – Machine Gun Fellatio
 "Rabbit with Fangs" – Magic Dirt
 "Smile" – Pangaea
 "Sunbury '97" – The Fauves
 "Debaser" – Pixies
 "Lust for Life" – Iggy Pop
 "(You Gotta) Fight for Your Right (To Party!)" – N.Y.C.C.
 "Kool Thing" – Sonic Youth
 "Bring Tha Noize" – Public Enemy featuring Anthrax 
 "When the Shit Goes Down" – Cypress Hill
 "Somebody to Shove" – Soul Asylum
 "Let It Slide" – Mudhoney
 "Don't It Get You Down" – Deadstar
 "Heaven" – Mr. Blonde
 "Lose My Mind (A Friend In London)" – Bill
 "Sometimes" – Brand New Heavies
 "The Joker Is Wild" – Corduroy
 "Fuck the Millennium" – 2K

Indie 2000 Volume 3

Disc 1
 "Josie" – Blink-182 
 "Fight for Your Right (To Party)" – N.Y.C.C.
 "It's Tricky (Jason's Slo-pocus Radio Mix)" – Run–DMC vs. Jason Nevins 
 "Walkin' on the Sun (Feet Beat Manifesto Mix)" – Smash Mouth
 "Touch, Peel and Stand" – Days of the New
 "Breathe" – Kylie Minogue
 "Smack My Bitch Up (Edit)" – The Prodigy
 "Brimful of Asha (Norman Cook Remix Single Version)" – Cornershop 
 "Not the Sunscreen Song" – John Safran
 "One Headlight" – The Wallflowers
 "Criminal (Radio Edit)" – Fiona Apple
 "Change in Me" – Monique Brumby
 "All for You" – Sister Hazel
 "Bleed" – Soulfly
 "Shake Hands with Beef" – Primus 
 "Wash It Away" – Black Lab
 "100% Jesus" – Daniella's Daze
 "Ready or Not (Radio Edit)" – manBREAK

Disc 2
 "Just Ace" – Grinspoon 
 "Mum Changed the Locks" – Frenzal Rhomb 
 "Got Sold on Heaven" – Snout
 "She Riff" – Magic Dirt
 "Jimmy Rogers" – Fur
 "Roll Credit" – Something for Kate
 "Music Is Crap" – Custard
 "You Sound Like Louis Burdett" – The Whitlams
 "Sirena" – Dirty Three
 "Smokin' Johnny Cash" – The Blackeyed Susans
 "Suspicion Bells" – Effigy
 "Letter Never Sent" – Bodyjar
 "Hi-C's" – Screamfeeder
 "It's Not Real" – Fini Scad
 "Red Light Disco" – Moler
 "Lightning Crashes" – Live
 "Jump Around (Master Mix)" – House of Pain
 "You Are What You Is" – Frank Zappa
 "Get Higher" – Black Grape
 "Busy Child (Radio Edit)" – The Crystal Method
 "I'm a Disco Dancer (And a Sweet Romancer) (Ernie's Edit)" – Christopher Just

Indie 2000 Volume 4

Disc 1
 "Heavy Heart" – You Am I
 "Black Friday" – Grinspoon
 "Doctor Worm" – They Might Be Giants
 "Pure Morning" – Placebo
 "Every Day Should Be a Holiday" – The Dandy Warhols
 "Shimmer" – Fuel
 "Sweater" – Eskimo Joe
 "Engel" – Rammstein
 "Resurrection" – Fear Factory
 "I Hate Stupid People" – Insurge
 "California Stars" – Billy Bragg & Wilco
 "Rachael" – Buffalo Tom
 "Eat Me" – Arkarna
 "Skankin' Carpark Blues" – The Porkers 
 "Tequila Sunrise" – Cypress Hill
 "Revolution (Bring the Noise)" – Subsonic Legacy
 "Baddest DJ on 2 Turntables" – Wax Assassins
 "Banana Chips" – Shonen Knife
 "No Surprises" – Even

Disc 2
 "Flagpole Sitta" – Harvey Danger 
 "Sex and Candy" – Marcy Playground
 "Father of Mine" – Everclear
 "My Favourite Game" – The Cardigans
 "Thunderbirds Are Coming Out" – TISM
 "Save Yourself" – Stabbing Westward
 "Road Rage" – Catatonia
 "If You Tolerate This Your Children Will Be Next" – Manic Street Preachers 
 "Drinking in L.A." – Bran Van 3000
 "Charlie No. 3" – The Whitlams
 "Cinnamon Lip" – Pollyanna
 "The Ballad of Tom Jones" – Space with Cerys Matthews 
 "Party Hard" – Pulp 
 "No Logic" – Area-7
 "Summertime" – The Sundays
 "A Punk Named Josh" – Chopper One
 "Black the Sun" – Alex Lloyd
 "Hey Now Now" – Swirl 360
 "Bradley" – Coal Chamber

Indie 2000 Volume 5

Disc 1
 "Freak on a Leash" – Korn 
 "Never Had So Much Fun" – Frenzal Rhomb 
 "More Than You Are" – Grinspoon 
 "Don't Wanna Be Left Out" – Powderfinger  
 "When I Grow Up" – Garbage  
 "Jesus or a Gun" – Fuel  
 "Polyester Bride" – Liz Phair  
 "Shazam!" – Spiderbait  
 "Turn Up Your Stereo" – Eskimo Joe   
 "Stereo" – The Watchmen  
 "I Wanna Be a Nudist" – Regurgitator  
 "Hazy Shade of Winter" – Bodyjar 
 "Can't Get Enough" – Suede  
 "You Stole the Sun from My Heart" – Manic Street Preachers   
 "Heart and Shoulder" – Heather Nova 
 "Bitter Words" – Area-7 
 "Cha Cha Cha" – Grand Theft Auto  
 "Get Down" – Jungle Brothers  
 "Radio Funk" – Endorphin   
 "The Universe" – Snog  
 "Lift" – Sunk Loto 
 "Mystical Machine Gun" – Kula Shaker 
 "B-Line" – Lamb

Disc 2
 "Tender" – Blur
 "Sheep Go to Heaven" – Cake
 "Hallways" – Something for Kate
 "Lucky Star" – Alex Lloyd
 "Waltz #2" – Elliott Smith
 "You Don't Care About Us" – Placebo
 "What It's Like" – Everlast
 "Right Here, Right Now" – Fatboy Slim
 "Push Upstairs" – Underworld
 "Theophilus Thistler (An Exercise in Vowels)" – Sonic Animation
 "Touched" – VAST
 "Action and Drama" – Bis (Some pressings featured the song 'Theme From Tokyo' by the same artist, however 'Action and Drama' is listed on the track list)
 "Spray Water on the Stereo" – Turnstyle
 "Young" – Primary
 "Hit Song" – Custard
 "Delicious" – Moler
 "Crush" – Violetine
 "Have Your Way" – Superheist
 "Ladyfingers" – Luscious Jackson

Indie 2000 Volume 6

Disc 1

 "Falling Away from Me" – Korn
 "Guerrilla Radio" – Rage Against the Machine
 "What's My Age Again?" – Blink 182
 "Blue Monday" – Orgy
 "Spit It Out (Overcaffeinated Hyper Version)" – Slipknot 
 "Underdog" – Testeagles
 "Ready 1" – Grinspoon
 "Ten Minutes" – The Get Up Kids
 "Boredom" – The Tenants
 "All Torn Down" – The Living End
 "Second Class Citizen" – Area-7
 "Pumping on Your Stereo" – Supergrass
 "Didley Squat" – Sonic Animation
 "Build It Up, Tear It Down" – Fatboy Slim
 "Swastika Eyes (Edit)" – Primal Scream
 "Rendez-Vu" – Basement Jaxx
 "Supersonic (Radio Edit)" – Jamiroquai
 "Mutha Fukka on a Motocycle" – Machine Gun Fellatio
 "Comin' Up from Behind" – Marcy Playground
 "Plastic" – Spiderbait
 "Skin Tight" – The Donnas
 "In the Middle" – Nitocris

Disc 2
  
 "Take a Picture" – Filter 
 "Miss You Love" – Silverchair
 "Passenger" – Powderfinger
 "Genre Casting" – Lo-Tel
 "Burn to Shine" – Ben Harper
 "Heaven Coming Down" – The Tea Party
 "Every You Every Me" – Placebo
 "Come Original" – 311
 "Coffee & TV" – Blur
 "Whatever You Want" – Something for Kate
 "Stolen Car" – Beth Orton
 "Ends" – Everlast
 "Every Morning" – Sugar Ray
 "You Gotta Love This City" – The Whitlams
 "Don't Change Your Plans" – Ben Folds Five
 "Cowboy" – Kid Rock
 "Beautiful" – Joydrop
 "Something Special" – Alex Lloyd

Indie 2000 Volume 7

Disc 1

 "Yellow" – Coldplay 
 "Bohemian Like You" – The Dandy Warhols 
 "Slave to the Wage" – Placebo
 "Damage" – You Am I
 "Pacifier" – Shihad
 "Dirty Jeans" – Magic Dirt
 "Teenager of the Year" – Lo-Tel
 "Teenage Dirtbag" – Wheatus 
 "Porcelain" – Moby  
 "The Time Is Now" – Moloko 
 "Music Is My Radar" – Blur 
 "Wasting My Life" – The Hippos
 "Start Making Sense" – Area-7
 "Set the Record Straight" – Reef
 "Goodbye" – 28 Days
 "Secrets" – Grinspoon
 "Catch the Sun" – Doves
 "Music Non Stop" – Kent
 "Drive" – Chakradiva
 "King of the DJ's" – Grand Theft Auto
 "Too Big for Your Boots" – The Porkers

Disc 2

 "Renegades of Funk (Radio Edit)" – Rage Against the Machine 
 "Pictures in the Mirror" – The Living End
 "Fall to the Ground" – Bodyjar
 "Nothing's Wrong" – Frenzal Rhomb
 "Please Leave" – Jebediah
 "Make Me Bad (Sickness In Salvation Mix)" – Korn 
 "Every Fucking City" – Paul Kelly
 "Wonderful" – Everclear
 "Sunken Eyes" – Sunk Loto
 "Crush the Losers" – Regurgitator
 "The Best Things (Radio Edit)" – Filter
 "Stellar" – Incubus
 "Killing the Fly" – The Union Underground
 "Holiday" – The Get Up Kids
 "Go Let It Out!" – Oasis
 "My Way Home" – Alex Lloyd
 "Charlie's Angels 2000" – Apollo 440 
 "Never Gonna Come Back Down (Single Edit)" – BT featuring Mike Doughty
 "Size Does Matter" – ONinc
 "B.O.B (Radio Mix)" – OutKast
 "Mind Bomb" – Oblivia

Indie Volume 8

Disc 1 
 "Clint Eastwood" – Gorillaz
 "It Don't Matter" – Rehab
 "Three Dimensions (Single Edit)" – Something for Kate
 "The Drugs Don't Work" – Ben Harper
 "Amazing" – Alex Lloyd
 "Drive" – Incubus
 "Little L (Single Edit)" – Jamiroquai
 "Weapon of Choice" – Fatboy Slim
 "Rock the Nation" – Michael Franti & Spearhead
 "Special K" – Placebo
 "Pace It" – Magic Dirt
 "Get Off" – The Dandy Warhols
 "Rose Rouge Pt. 1" – St Germain
 "Rome Wasn't Built in a Day" – Morcheeba
 "No Man's Woman" – Sinéad O'Connor
 "AM Radio" – Everclear
 "Godless" – U.P.O.
 "Everything in Its Right Place" – Radiohead
 "I Don't Care What Your Friends Say" – Soda Racer
 "Much Against Everyone's Advice" – Soulwax

Disc 2 
 "The Heretic Anthem" – Slipknot
 "Dig" – Mudvayne
 "Last Resort" – Papa Roach
 "Stash Up" – OPM
 "Little Things" – Good Charlotte
 "Lonesome" – Unwritten Law
 "No Cigar" – Millencolin
 "Roll On" – The Living End
 "Feed It" – Bodyjar
 "40 Boys in 40 Nights" – The Donnas
 "All My Best Friends Are Metalheads" – Less Than Jake
 "I Hear You Calling" – Gob
 "Killing Time" – Hed PE
 "Charlotte" – Kittie
 "Invisible Wounds (Dark Bodies)" – Fear Factory
 "Rumba" – Ill Niño
 "I'm with Stupid" – Static-X
 "Turn Me On "Mr. Deadman" (Explicit Version)" – The Union Underground
 "Again & Again" – Taproot
 "Pain" – Stereomud
 "Smash It Up" – The (International) Noise Conspiracy
 "Die, All Right!" – The Hives
 "Don't Call Me Baby" – Frankenbok

Indie Volume 9

Disc 1 
 "Cherry Lips (Go Baby Go!)" – Garbage
 "Rockin' the Suburbs" – Ben Folds
 "The Hindu Times" – Oasis
 "This Mess We're In" – PJ Harvey
 "Island in the Sun" – Weezer
 "Souljacker Part I" – Eels
 "Twenty Years" – Something for Kate
 "Sexual Healing" – Ben Harper
 "Lullaby" – The Tea Party
 "Knives Out" – Radiohead
 "Gabriel" – Lamb
 "Roseability" – Idlewild
 "Bliss" – Muse
 "Economic Decline" – Rocket Science
 "Shock" – Cartman
 "Supagloo" – Magic Dirt
 "Karma" – 1200 Techniques
 "You Give Me Something" – Jamiroquai
 "Superstylin'" – Groove Armada
 "Man, It's So Loud in Here" – They Might Be Giants

Disc 2 
 "Main Offender" – The Hives
 "First Date" – Blink-182
 "She's Got the Look" – Guttermouth
 "Divine Intervention" – Pennywise
 "Mean Girl" – Unwritten Law
 "Fall Down" – Jebediah
 "Say What?" – 28 Days featuring Apollo 440
 "Hope Is Where the Heart Is" – Seraph's Coal
 "Nice to Know You" – Incubus
 "The Cell" – The Butterfly Effect
 "Feel So Numb" – Rob Zombie
 "Bodies" – Drowning Pool
 "Sonne" – Rammstein
 "Linchpin" – Fear Factory
 "Synthetic" – Spineshank
 "Squash That Fly" – Fu Manchu
 "The Shame of Life" – Butthole Surfers
 "Giving In" – Adema
 "Flashback" – Tomahawk
 "What I Always Wanted" – Kittie
 "Burn Baby Burn" – Ash
 "Killing Time" – Hed PE

Compilation album series
Compilation albums by Australian artists
Rock compilation albums